El Bañado (Capayán) is a village and municipality in Catamarca Province in northwestern Argentina.

GPS Coordinates
DD Coordinates: -28.6333308 -65.8666632
DMS Coordinates: -28°37'59.99" S -65°51'59.99" W
Geohash Coordinates: 6dcjj5mqg820w
UTM Coordinates: 20J 219743.85794039 6829275.5988872

References

Populated places in Catamarca Province